The Port of Durrës is the largest seaport of Albania. The port is situated in the city of Durrës. The Port is located at the north end of the Bay of Durrës, an extensive body of water between Kalaja e Turrës and Cape Durrës.

As of 2014, the port ranks as the largest passenger port in Albania and one of the largest passenger port in the Adriatic Sea, with annual passenger volume of approximately 1.5 million.

Several wrecks are located near the entrance channel to the Port of Durrës. The use of tugboats is compulsory in the Port of Durrës. As of 2011, the port underwent major renovation and expansion.

The Albanian government is planning to relocate the existing port northward to Porto Romano area and build on the current port grounds of a luxury marina, putting Albania on the Mediterranean luxury marina network map. The Durres Yachts and Marina project is planned to be built by Dubai-based company Emaar, consisting of residential construction development, recreational areas, and marina for super yachts.

History

Epidamnos (Durrës) was seized by Glaukias, the king of Illyria, in 312 BC, but after a war with the Roman Republic in 229 BC ended in a decisive defeat for the Illyrians the city passed to Roman rule, under which it was developed as a major military and naval base. The Romans renamed it Dyrrachium (Greek: Δυρράχιον/Dyrrhachion). They considered the name Epidamnos to be inauspicious because of its wholly coincidental similarities with the Latin word damnum, meaning "loss" or "harm". The meaning of Dyrrachium ("bad spine" or "difficult ridge" in Greek) is unclear, but it has been suggested that it refers to the imposing cliffs near the city. Julius Caesar's rival Pompey made a stand there in 48 BC before fleeing south to Greece. Under Roman rule, Dyrrachium prospered; it became the western end of the Via Egnatia, the great Roman road that led to Thessalonica and on to Constantinople. Another lesser road led south to the city of Buthrotum, the modern Butrint. The Roman emperor Caesar Augustus made the city a colony for veterans of his legions following the Battle of Actium, proclaiming it a civitas libera (free town).

In the 4th century AD, Dyrrachium was made the capital of the Roman province of Epirus nova. It was the birthplace of the emperor Anastasius I in circa 430. Some time later that century, Dyrrachium was struck by a powerful earthquake, which destroyed the city's defences. Anastasius I rebuilt and strengthened the city walls, thus creating the strongest fortifications in the western Balkans. The 12 m (36 ft)-high walls were so thick that, according to the Byzantine historian Anna Komnene, four horsemen could ride abreast on them. Significant portions of the ancient city defences still remain, although they have been much reduced over the centuries.

Like much of the rest of the Balkans, Dyrrachium and the surrounding Dyrraciensis provinciae suffered considerably from barbarian incursions during the Migrations Period. It was besieged in 481 by Theodoric the Great, king of the Ostrogoths, and in subsequent centuries had to fend off frequent attacks by the Bulgarians. Unaffected by the fall of the Western Roman Empire, the city continued under the Byzantine Empire as an important port and a major link between the Empire and Western Europe. During communism in Albania, the port was named after Albanian communist leader, Enver Hoxha.

The port of Durrës is regularly visited by various Adriatic ferries. Most ferries connect Durrës with Bari and Ancona, some also with Trieste and rarely with Brindisi. A new ferry terminal opened in 2013. In 2019, 878,687 passengers and 259,175 vehicles were shipped on 1052 ferries respectively. 19 cruise ships with over 4500 passengers on board called at the port in 2019.

A small harbor for fishing boats was built on the west mole and opened in 2013. The fishing port is protected by a small new pier.

Since the beginning of 2019 there has been a customs office of the Republic of Kosovo in the port. This simplifies the import of goods to Kosovo and relieves the Vërmica/Morina border crossing. Albania and Kosovo are gradually harmonizing their customs systems and are striving for a customs union in the long term.

See also
Durrës
Economy of Albania
Transport in Albania
Adriatic Sea

References

External links
 Official website
 Official site of the planned Durres Yacht and Marina luxury marina complex
 Map of port of Durrës by US army

Durrës
Durres
Transport in Durrës County